
Karl Gümbel (24 June 1888 – 28 October 1970) was a general in the Wehrmacht of Nazi Germany during World War II. He was a recipient of the Knight's Cross of the Iron Cross.

Awards and decorations 

 Knight's Cross of the Iron Cross on 30 October 1941 as Oberst and commander of Infanterie-Regiment 516

References

Citations

Bibliography

 

1888 births
1970 deaths
People from Moselle (department)
Lieutenant generals of the German Army (Wehrmacht)
German Army personnel of World War I
Recipients of the clasp to the Iron Cross, 1st class
Recipients of the Knight's Cross of the Iron Cross
German prisoners of war in World War II
People from Alsace-Lorraine